Jeremy José Betancor Santana (born 10 September 1998) is a Spanish footballer who plays for UD Las Palmas C as a forward.

Club career
Born in Las Palmas, Canary Islands, Jeremy joined UD Las Palmas' youth setup in 2014, from CEF Puertos de Las Palmas. On 5 January 2016, before even having appeared for the reserves, he was called up with the first team for a Copa del Rey match against SD Eibar.

Jeremy made his professional debut on 7 January 2016, coming on as a first-half substitute for injured Asdrúbal in a 3–2 win at the Ipurua Municipal Stadium.

References

External links

1998 births
Living people
Footballers from Las Palmas
Spanish footballers
Association football forwards
Tercera División players
UD Las Palmas players
UD Las Palmas Atlético players
UD Las Palmas C players